Michael or Mike Carr may refer to:

Michael Carr (composer) (1905–1968), British composer
Michael Carr (cricketer) (1933–1995), English cricketer
Michael Carr (English footballer) (born 1983), currently playing for Stalybridge Celtic
Michael Carr (Gaelic footballer), played for Donegal
Michael Carr (Labour politician) (1947–1990), British politician, MP for Bootle in 1990
Michael Carr (Liberal Democrat politician) (born 1946), British politician, MP for Ribble Valley 1991–92
Mike Carr (game designer) (born 1951), American fantasy writer and game designer
Mike Carr (musician) (1937–2017), English jazz organist, pianist and vibraphonist
Mike Carr (ice hockey) (born 1959), ice hockey player
Michael Carr, presenter of Faces of Death